A human video is a form of theater combining music, Modern Dance and drama, along with interpretive dance, American Sign Language, pantomime, and classic mime. A human video consists of a song or medley played over loudspeakers while actors use rhythmic physical movement (gestures and other movements of the limbs and body) to communicate emotions to a given audience.

The performance is presented in a form similar to a music video. It presents a story that illuminates a particular artistic intent through spatial relationships, meaningful gestures, and artistic movement. 

The story told within the video can be either implicit in the words of the song or a story written independently of the original artist's meaning.

Just as more "traditional" forms of theater can be situated on different types of stages, so too can these dramatic acts. This particular form of drama can perform the same text in many different venues without disrupting its meaning. Because it typically has no set and limited costumes, it can be performed in nearly any location.

Props are sometimes used, but are forbidden in some competitive venues. In this instance, props are restricted in an effort to force creativity—because in the ideal Human Video, all actors on stage should be used to represent objects like crosses, thrones, trees or giants. Actors movements demonstrate a story and the theme of the song being played.

In the United States, one example of how human videos have permeated the culture is the inclusion of human videos in Fine Arts Festivals and church ministry groups (Assemblies of God, Pentecostal Holiness Church, Church of God, etc.) in a variety of Protestant denominations. The Fine Arts Festival in the Assemblies of God denomination is the largest and most intense of all competitions and categories. Churches spend many months and countless hours practicing in order to receive recognition at the National Fine Arts Festival.

One compelling example of Human Video creativity can be found in Solo Human Video Performed at NFAF. The talented artist invented a move, popularly known as 'The Wheelchair Walk' in Human Video circles.

History
The name "human video" was coined by Randy Phillips. He is reported to have performed the first "human video" in a chapel service at Central Bible College, with several elements used from the then quite popular Deaf Ministry Team. It was used more formally in the early 1990s at Phoenix First Assembly of God led by Pastor Tommy Barnett.

Although elements of the form have existed in theatre for centuries and no one can actually claim to have invented it, Mr. Phillips began to use it as a ministry tool first at church services and then for outreach and missions with the help of Pastor Lloyd Ziegler and the ministry training program called Master's Commission.

Human Video Example

Solo Human Video Performed at NFAF

Human Video Performed at a Church

Human Video Using Sticks

Human Video performed at a Christian Event

Human Videos Website

Human Videos

Performing arts